Alois Tichana (born 5 December 1984) is a Zimbabwean cricketer. He made his first-class debut for Northerns cricket team in the 2006–07 Logan Cup on 12 April 2007.

References

External links
 

1984 births
Living people
Zimbabwean cricketers
Centrals cricketers
Mashonaland cricketers
Mashonaland Eagles cricketers
Northerns (Zimbabwe) cricketers
Sportspeople from Harare